Part Two (also known as Part Two: The Endless Not) is an album by English industrial band Throbbing Gristle, released in 2007 through record label Mute Records.

Background 

In a similar vein to the band's 1978 album D.o.A: The Third and Final Report, the album features four tracks each created by each individual member of the group. Bryin Dall was the co-writer and performer on the track by Genesis P-Orridge. The cover image is a picture of Mount Kailash taken by Martin Gray.

Release 

Part Two: The Endless Not was released in 2007 through record label Mute Records. Included with the first 4000 copies is one of four "totemic gifts", each made from one of the following materials: bone, wood, rubber and copper. A fifth stainless steel totem was made available in a Japanese edition of the CD. A sixth totemic gift is made of 23 carat gold. The gifts were handmade under the supervision of Peter Christopherson in Thailand.

Critical reception 

Part Two: The Endless Not was generally well received by critics.

Pitchfork wrote, "The Endless Not features some of the subtlest songwriting of TG's career, playing that knot of tension for all its worth and all the more disturbing for how pensive and restrained it feels". PopMatters wrote that the album "sounds like a core of musicians who have rediscovered whatever spark it was that led them to create the entity that they are now so often defined by". Tiny Mix Tapes called the album "more of a rebirthing than a reunion".

On the other hand, AllMusic panned the album, calling it "ridiculous".

Track listing

Personnel 
 Throbbing Gristle

 Genesis P-Orridge – vocals, bass guitar, violin
 Cosey Fanni Tutti – lead guitar, cornet, samples
 Peter Christopherson – sleeve design and art direction, samples
 Chris Carter – production, audio mastering, programming, synthesizer

 Technical

 Martin Gray – album cover photograph

References 

2007 albums
Throbbing Gristle albums
Mute Records albums